Siino is an Italian surname. Notable people with the surname include:
Rosanne Siino (born 1962), Italian-American businesswoman and former Vice President of Communications for Netscape
Salvatore Siino (1904–1963), Italian prelate of the Catholic Church

Italian-language surnames